Kongsmoen is a village in the northern part of the municipality of Høylandet in Trøndelag county, Norway. Prior to 1964, the Kongsmoen area was part of the municipality of Foldereid. Kongsmo Chapel is located in this village, and it serves the people in the northern part of Høylandet municipality.

References

Villages in Trøndelag
Høylandet